Luigi Maglione (2 March 1877 – 22 August 1944) was an Italian Cardinal of the Roman Catholic Church. He was elevated to the cardinalate in 1935 and served as the Vatican Secretary of State under Pope Pius XII from 1939 until his death. Pius XII never replaced Maglione, opting to assume the responsibilities of the office himself, with the assistance of two undersecretaries.

Early career and education

Born in Casoria, Maglione was educated at the Almo Collegio Capranica and Pontifical Gregorian University, from where he obtained doctorates in philosophy and theology, in Rome. He was ordained to the priesthood on 25 July 1901, and then did pastoral work in the Archdiocese of Naples until 1903.

Maglione studied at the Pontifical Ecclesiastical Academy from 1905 to 1907; he later taught there from 1915 to 1918. He served an official of the Vatican Secretariat of State from 1908 to 1918, rising to become a Privy Chamberlain (17 June 1910) and a Domestic Prelate (22 February 1918). He was also a provisional papal representative to the League of Nations and a special papal envoy to Switzerland.

Nunciatures
On 1 September 1920, Maglione was appointed Nuncio to Switzerland and Titular Archbishop of Cesarea di Palestina by Pope Benedict XV. He received his episcopal consecration on the following 26 September from Cardinal Pietro Gasparri, with Archbishops Bonaventura Cerretti and Lorenzo Schioppa serving as co-consecrators, in the church of Santa Maria in Trastevere. Archbishop Maglione was later named Apostolic Nuncio to France on 23 June 1926. Upon his arrival in France he was resentfully considered pro-German, but had become so liked by the French Government before he left the post that he was reported to have had a hand in forming the Hoare-Laval Pact during the Italo-Ethiopian War. During his nunciature in France, on 25 July 1930, Maglione ordained Yves Congar to the priesthood.

Cardinal Secretary of State
Pope Pius XI created him Cardinal-Priest of Santa Pudenziana in the consistory of 16 December 1935, and then Prefect of the Sacred Congregation of the Council on 22 July 1938. Cardinal Maglione was one of the cardinal electors who participated in the 1939 papal conclave, which selected Pope Pius XII. Pius XII, who was a former schoolmate of Maglione's, tapped Maglione to succeed him as Vatican Secretary of State on 10 March 1939.

His tenure as Secretary of State included most of World War II and the Holocaust, much of his work being documented in the eleven volumes of the Vatican's wartime documents, Actes et Documents du Saint Siège relatifs à la Seconde Guerre Mondiale. After falling under Nazi occupation, Lithuania appealed to the Vatican to reintegrate its dioceses into the country and replace its bishops, to which Maglione responded, "The government of Kaunas should appreciate, that the Holy See cannot run behind armies and change bishops as combatant troops occupy new territories belonging to countries other than their own."

Cardinal Maglione died a year before the war's end in his native Casoria, from neuritis and circulatory ailments. Upon his death, Pius XII assumed the duties of the office himself, with assistance from Domenico Tardini and Giovanni Battista Montini (who later became Pope Paul VI).

He vigorously defended Pius XII's wartime diplomacy, once declaring, "If you ask why the documents sent by the Pontiff to the Polish bishops have not been made public, know that it seems better in the Vatican to follow the same norms, the Polish bishops themselves follow...Isn’t this what has to be done? Should the father of Christianity increase the misfortunes of Poles in their own country?" The relationship between Maglione and the Pontiff was so close that Italians were known to joke that whenever Pius XII went out without his maglione (Italian for "sweater"), he caught cold.

Notes

References
 Pierre Blet, Pius XII and the Second World War, London, Boston, 1997
Catholic-Hierarchy.org biographical details
Mary Gloria Chang, "The Vatican and the German Resistance During World War II: 1939–1940" The Catholic Social Science Review 14 (2009): 385–406

External links
 

 

 

1877 births
1944 deaths
People from the Province of Naples
World War II political leaders
20th-century Italian cardinals
Apostolic Nuncios to France
Apostolic Nuncios to Switzerland
Pontifical Gregorian University alumni
Pontifical Ecclesiastical Academy alumni
Cardinal Secretaries of State
Members of the Sacred Congregation of the Council
Cardinals created by Pope Pius XI
Almo Collegio Capranica alumni
Roman Catholic titular archbishops of Caesarea